CMLL held their third annual En Busca de un Ídolo ("In Search of an Idol") in 2014 starting on March 25 and running until June 20. All tournament matches took place in CMLL's main building, Arena México on Tuesdays and Fridays for the first round and exclusively on Fridays during CMLL's Super Viernes for the second round. Like the first tournament the 2014 version focused on a group of young wrestlers trying to prove themselves to both CMLL and the fans. The first round of the tournament was a Round-robin tournament format between eight wrestlers, scoring points based on victories, judges assessments and an online poll. The second round included the top four winners of round one, once again in a round-robin tournament with points. The final match featured the top two point earners in a match against each other, with the winner taking the trophy and prize. In the end Cavernario defeated Hechicero to win the entire tournament.

Tournament Prize

The winner of the tournament would be given the opportunity to work on the 2015 Fantastica Mania show, an event co-promoted by CMLL and New Japan Pro-Wrestling (NJPW) that takes place in Japan once a year. The winner would also receive a title match for the Mexican National Welterweight Championship against champion Titán at a later date.

Participants

The 2014 tournament began with a 16-man Torneo cibernetico elimination match, where the first 8 wrestlers eliminated from the match would not move on to the Round-robin tournament portion of the show. The match took place on March 25, 2014 and saw Black Panther, Canelo Casas, El Rebelde, Espiritu Negro, Flyer, Herodes Jr., Metálico and Oro Jr. from the tournament. The eight finalist were randomly split into two teams, each given their own coach, Negro Casas and Virus.

Team Negro Casas
Cachorro
Cavernario
Dragon Lee
Soberano Jr.

Team Virus
Guerrero Negro Jr.
Hechicero
Star Jr.
Super Halcón Jr.

Judges
Mr. Niebla
Shocker
El Tirantes
4th Judge changed from week to week

Round one

Overall standings

Round two
On May 23, 2014 the four finalists and their trainers faced off in a six-man tag team match. Since Virus only had one of his team members advance CMLL moved Cachorro to his team with Virus, Cachorro and Hechicero defeating Negro Casas, Cavernario and Dragon Lee in a preview of the second round.

Overall standings

Finals and aftermath
The finals took place on June 20, 2014 between the two top point earners, Hechicero and Cavernario. Hechicero had been the point leader throughout both rounds of the tournament, largely due to the fan votes, lost to Cavernario two falls to one. The following week Negro Casas, Virus and the 8 tournament competitors faced off in a Torneo cibernetico elimination match that saw Negro eliminate Virus to win the match. On July 27, 2014 Cavernario cashed in one of his tournament prizes as he faced Titán for the Mexican National Welterweight Championship, but lost.

References

2014 in professional wrestling
CMLL En Busca de un Ídolo